Eriogonum latens is a species of wild buckwheat known by the common name Inyo buckwheat. It is native to the western Great Basin region, in the eastern slopes of the Sierra Nevada and the Inyo Mountains of California and the White Mountains, which extend just into western Nevada. It is an uncommon member of the flora in the sagebrush and woodlands of these mountains, where it grows in granitic sandy soils.

Description
Eriogonum latens is a perennial herb growing from a woody caudex in a basal patch of rounded to oval green leaves up to about 3 centimeters long on short petioles. The inflorescence arises on an erect, naked scape, or flowering stem, and bears many whitish or yellowish flowers in a spherical cluster.

External links
Jepson Manual Treatment — Eriogonum latens
Eriogonum latens — U.C. Photo gallery

latens
Flora of California
Flora of Nevada
Flora of the Great Basin
Flora of the Sierra Nevada (United States)
Flora of the California desert regions
Natural history of Inyo County, California
•
Flora without expected TNC conservation status